The Feudum Acinganorum was a fiefdom established around 1360 in Corfu (at the time a colony of the Republic of Venice), which mainly used Romani serfs and to which the Romanies on the island were subservient.

References 

Feudalism in Europe
History of Corfu
Romani history
Romani in Greece
Serfdom